Ivar Grydeland (born 1 October 1976) is a Norwegian jazz musician (guitar) and composer raised in Kongsberg.

Career 
Grydeland was born in Trondheim, Norway, and studied jazz guitar at the Norwegian Academy of Music (1996–2000, and 2001–2003). He started his jazz career in the Big Band 'Ung Musikk' in 1995. He collaborates within the band Huntsville (six albums) together with Tonny Kluften and Ingar Zach, within 'Dans les arbres' (two albums) together with Christian Wallumrød, Xavier Charles and Ingar Zach, and plays with Hanne Hukkelberg. Grydeland plays acoustic guitar, electric guitar and banjo with a mixture of finger picking technique, various types of bows, metal, propellers and electronic devices, he teaches at Norwegian Academy of Music in Oslo, and runs the record label Sofa.

In 2000 Grydeland participated together with Tonny Kluften on a project with Tony Oxley resulting in the album Triangular Screen. On the first album in his own name These Six (2003), he collaborated in a trio with Tonny Kluften and Paul Lovens. With Philipp Wachsmann, Charlotte Hug and Ingar Zach he released the album Wazahugy (2002), and with Jaap Blonk and Ingar Zach Improvisors (2004). In 2006 the release Szc Zcz Cze Zec Eci Cin within the trio Ivar Grydeland/Thomas Lehn/Ingar Zach followed, and Improvisors together with Jaap Blonk and Ingar Zach in 2004. Grydeland collaborated with Leonel Kaplan on the album Portraits 2004 (2011), and he released the critically acclaimed solo album Bathymetric Modes in 2012.

Discography

Solo albums 
Solo project
2012: Bathymetric Modes (Hubro Records)

Trio including with Tonny Kluften & Paul Lovens
2003: These Six (Sofa Records)

As Ivar Grydeland/Thomas Lehn/Ingar Zach trio
2006: Szc Zcz Cze Zec Eci Cin (Musica Genera)

Collaborations 
Duo with Ingar Zach
2000: Visiting Ants (Sofa Records)
2004: You Should Have Seen Me Before We First Met (Sofa Records)
2011: Lady Lord (Sofa Records), live as Emo Albino at Kongsberg Jazzfestival

With Tony Oxley Project 1
2000: Triangular Screen (Sofa Records), trio including with Tonny Kluften

Within No Spaghetti Edition
2001: Listen... And Tell Me What It Was (Sofa Records)
2002: Pasta Variations (Sofa Records)
2003: Real Time Satellite Data (Sofa Records)
2006: Sketches of a Fusion (Sofa Records), feat. Christian Wallumrød

With Philipp Wachsmann, Charlotte Hug & Ingar Zach
2002: Wazahugy (Sofa Records)

Within HISS including with Tonny Kluften, Pat Thomas & Ingar Zach
2003: Zahir (Rossbin Records)

With Jaap Blonk & Ingar Zach
2004: Improvisors (Kontrans Records)

Within Arm 
2004: Open Reminder (Melektronikk Records)

Duo with Yumiko Tanaka
2005: Continental Crust (Sofa Records)

Within Huntsville trio including with Tonny Kluften & Ingar Zach
2006: For The Middle Class (Rune Grammofon)
2008: Eco, Arches & Eras (Rune Grammofon)
2011: For Flowers, Cars And Merry Wars (Hubro Records)
2011: Splashgirl/Huntsville (Hubro Records), together with Splashgirl
2013: Past Increasing, Future Receding  (Hubro Records)

As Marc Pichelin/Xavier Charles/Ivar Grydeland
2008: North of the North (Sofa Records)

Within Dans Les Arbres including with Xavier Charles, Christian Wallumrød & Ingar Zach
2008: Dans Les Arbres (ECM Records)
2012: Canopée (ECM Records)

Within Ballrogg trio including with Klaus Ellerhusen Holm & Roger Arntzen
2008: Ballrogg (Bolage Records)
2010: Insomnia (Bolage Records)
2012: Cabin Music (Hubro Records)

With Leonel Kaplan
2011: Portraits 2004 (Audition Records), with Diego Chamy & Axel Dörner

Within Last Heat
2012: Last Heat (Jansen Plateproduksjon)

Finland including with Morten Qvenild, Jo Berger Myhre, Pål Hausken
2015: Rainy Omen (Hubro Music)

References

External links 

Ivar Grydeland at Groove.no
 

1976 births
Musicians from Trondheim
Musicians from Kongsberg
Living people
ECM Records artists
Hubro Music artists
Norwegian jazz guitarists
Norwegian jazz composers
Norwegian Academy of Music alumni
Academic staff of the Norwegian Academy of Music
21st-century Norwegian guitarists